Riverwalk may refer to:

Paths and trails

Australia
 Brisbane Riverwalk 
 Surfers Riverwalk, Gold Coast

Canada 
 Jack and Jean Leslie RiverWalk, in Downtown Calgary, Alberta

Mexico 
 Santa Lucía riverwalk in Monterrey, Nuevo León

United States 
 Blue Water River Walk, in Port Huron, Michigan
 Bradenton Riverwalk, Florida
 Chattahoochee RiverWalk, in Columbus, Georgia
 Chicago Riverwalk, Illinois
 Detroit River Walk, Michigan
 Riverwalk (Fort Lauderdale), Florida
 Hackensack RiverWalk, in Hudson County, New Jersey
 Historic Arkansas Riverwalk, in Pueblo, Colorado
 Jacksonville Riverwalks, Florida
 Miami Riverwalk, Florida
Riverwalk station
 Milwaukee Riverwalk, Wisconsin
 Naperville River Walk, Illinois
 Portland Riverwalk, in Ionia County, Michigan 
 Riverwalk in Reno, NV
 Riverwalk Augusta in Augusta, Georgia
 Riverwalk Trail, part of the Louisville Loop in Louisville, Kentucky
 Riverwalk, a part of Waterplace Park in Providence, Rhode Island
 San Antonio River Walk, Texas
 San Antonio Downtown and River Walk Historic District
 Tampa Riverwalk, Florida
 Tennessee Riverwalk, in Chattanooga, Tennessee

Other uses
 The Outlet Collection at Riverwalk, a mall in New Orleans, Louisiana, U.S.
 Montgomery Riverwalk Stadium, minor league ballpark in AL, US
 Operation River Walk, a coalition military operation of the Iraq War
 Riverwalk (album), by Lara & Reyes, 1998
 Riverwalk Kitakyūshū, a shopping centre in Japan
 Yodpiman Riverwalk, a community mall in Bangkok, Thailand

See also

 Boardwalk, an elevated footpath or causeway built with wood
 Esplanade, an open area for walking next to a river or large body of water
 Riverfront, a region along a river
 Hudson River Waterfront Walkway, in New Jersey, U.S.
 The Park at River Walk, or River Walk Park, Bakersfield, California, U.S.